The FIFA U-17 Women's World Cup is an international association football tournament for female players under the age of 17. It is organized by Fédération Internationale de Football Association (FIFA). The tournament is held in even-numbered years, starting in 2008. The current champions are Spain, which won its second title at the 2022 tournament in India.

History 

In 2003 after the inaugural success of the 2002 FIFA U-19 Women's World Championship, held in Canada, FIFA proposed adding a second youth tournament for girls. Continental confederations told FIFA it would be difficult to create a second championship, with the age limits in place at the time. Therefore, FIFA created the U-17 Women's World Cup and the U-20 Women's World Championship (renamed the "U-20 Women's World Cup" in 2007), the same age groups as its men's youth tournaments. Accordingly, the age limit for the U-19 championship was increased to 20, effective with the 2006 FIFA U-20 Women's World Championship in Russia. FIFA committed to creating a U-17 women's championship, stated to begin in 2008.

The first tournament was held in 2008 in New Zealand from 28 October to 16 November. Four cities hosted matches during the inaugural tournament – North Shore City (North Harbour Stadium), Hamilton (Waikato Stadium), Wellington (Wellington Stadium) and Christchurch (QEII Park). New Zealand won hosting rights at the same time that Chile received hosting honours for the 2008 FIFA U-20 Women's World Cup; Ecuador also bid for the event.

On 4 April 2020, FIFA announced the decision of postponing the 2020 World Cup which was originally scheduled in five venues to be held from 2 to 21 November in India. The tournament was initially postponed to 2021, subject to further monitoring. On 17 November 2020, FIFA announced that the 2020 edition of the tournamenth would be cancelled, and India were appointed as hosts of the next edition of the tournament in 2022. However, on 16 August 2022, India were stripped of their hosting rights for 2022 as the All India Football Federation was suspended by FIFA. The rights were given back to India on 26 August 2022 as the AIFF was reinstated by FIFA.

From 2024 the tournament will take place annually and will have 48 participating teams divided into 4 'mini-tournaments' of 12 teams each divided into 3 groups of 4 with the winners and best runner up qualifying to the MT semi-finals and the 2 winners qualifying to the final. The winner of each MT would qualify to a 'final four' tournament with 2 semi-finals, a third place match and a final to decide the FIFA U17 World Champions.

Qualification
Qualifying tournaments are:

Results

Teams reaching the top four

Awards

Overall team records
In this ranking 3 points are awarded for a win, 1 for a draw and 0 for a loss. As per statistical convention in football, matches decided in extra time are counted as wins and losses, while matches decided by penalty shoot-outs are counted as draws. Teams are ranked by total points, then by goal difference, then by goals scored.

Comprehensive team results by tournament
Legend
 – Champions
 – Runners-up
 – Third place
 – Fourth place
QF – Quarterfinals
GS – Group stage
 – Did not qualify 
 – Did not enter / Withdrew / Banned
 – Country did not exist or national team was inactive
 – Hosts
Q – Qualified for upcoming tournament

For each tournament, the flag of the host country and the number of teams in each finals tournament (in brackets) are shown.

Results by confederation
 — Hosting confederation

AFC

CAF

CONCACAF

CONMEBOL

OFC

UEFA

See also
 FIFA Women's World Cup
 FIFA U-20 Women's World Cup
 FIFA U-17 Men's World Cup

References

External links

 
 Women U-17 World Cup at the RSSSF

 
FIFA Women's World Cup
Under-17 World Cup
Youth football competitions
World youth sports competitions
Recurring sporting events established in 2008
U17, Women's